Lê Minh Hiển (born 1 January 1953) is a Vietnamese sports shooter. He competed in the mixed 50 metre rifle prone event at the 1980 Summer Olympics.

References

External links
 

1953 births
Living people
Vietnamese male sport shooters
Olympic shooters of Vietnam
Shooters at the 1980 Summer Olympics
Place of birth missing (living people)
20th-century Vietnamese people